Mort is a Discworld novel by Terry Pratchett, also broadcast as a BBC radio play.

Mort may also refer to:


Places
 Île des Morts, a French island
 Laguna del Mort, a lake in Italy
 Mont Mort, a mountain on the border between Switzerland and Italy
 Mort Bay, Papua New Guinea
 Mort Street, Canberra, Australia
 Mort's Dock, a former dry dock, slipway and shipyard in Australia

People
 Mort (name), including a list of people (and fictional characters) with the given name or surname
 Chris Mortensen (born 1951), American sports journalist nicknamed "Mort"

Science
 MORT (long non-coding RNA), human gene
 Mean oceanic residence time, used in chemical oceanography
 Tropical Storm Mort, in the 1997 Pacific typhoon season

Other uses
 MoRT, an album by Blut Aus Nord
 Mort, feminine form of Mar, a title of respect in the Syriac language

See also
 Micromort, a unit of risk of death